The  is a Japanese diesel multiple unit (DMU) train type introduced by the Japanese National Railways (JNR) in 1986. These were converted from ageing KiHa 35's to meet modern standards as new rolling stock before the company was privatized in 1987. After JNR was privatized, all seven cars were transferred to JR East.

No KiHa 38s remain in service since they ceased operation on the Kururi Line in December 2012, along with the last KiHa 30, which were also retired from JR East in the same year They were replaced by the new KiHa E130s on the same line.

In 2014, five cars were transferred to Myanmar Railways, and one car was transferred to Mizushima Rinkai Railway which entered service in May 2014.

Operations

JR East
 Hachiko Line
 Kawagoe Line
 Kururi Line, until 2012

Mizushima Rinkai Railway
 Mizushima Main Line, since 2014

Myanmar Railways
 Yangon Circular Line, since 2014

Withdrawal and resale

Mizushima Rinkai Railway
In 2014, KiHa 38 1004 was transferred to the Mizushima Rinkai Railway and was renumbered to KiHa 38 103. It entered service on 12 May 2014.

Myanmar Railways
Five former KiHa 38 railcars were shipped to Myanmar to be operated by Myanmar Railways in August 2014. They entered service in 2014.

The following cars were transferred to Myanmar:

Preserved examples
KiHa 38 1: preserved at Isumi Poppo-no-oka.

References

External links

JR East website 

Diesel multiple units of Japan
Japanese National Railways

Train-related introductions in 1986
East Japan Railway Company
Fuji rolling stock